History News Network (HNN) at George Washington University is a platform for historians writing about current events.

History
History News Network (HNN) is a non-profit corporation registered in Washington DC.  HNN was founded by Richard Shenkman, the author of Legends, Lies & Cherished Myths of World History. Shenkman served as editor until his retirement in 2019. Historian Kyla Sommers is the current editor-in-chief.   HNN sponsors several history-oriented blogs including Liberty and Power (coordinated by David T. Beito), and Jim Loewen.

HNN, originally hosted by George Mason University, moved to George Washington University in 2017.

Murray Polner was the long-time book editor for HNN.

In 2012, HNN celebrated the Fourth of July by holding a contest to select the worst books about American history every published.  Nominees David Barton’s The Jefferson Lies, Michael Bellesiles’s Arming America, Gavin Menzies’s 1421 : The Year China Discovered America, and Richard G. Williams’s 2006 book Stonewall Jackson: The Black Man’s Friend.

References

External links

George Washington University
Tertiary educational websites
Digital humanities
History organizations
History magazines published in the United States
Online magazines published in the United States
Political magazines published in the United States
Cultural magazines published in the United States
American political websites
Magazines published in Washington, D.C.